Charles Arthur Walker (c.1790 – 29 October 1873) was an Irish Member of Parliament.

Walker was born into a Protestant family at Tykillen, in County Wexford.  He studied law at Trinity College, Dublin, but was not called to the bar.  He was a deputy-lieutenant of the county, but later stated that he had initially avoided taking other public offices as he was "of retired habits", and preferred to spend his time on country pursuits.

Walker stood in Wexford Borough for the Irish Repeal Association at the 1831 UK general election, and was elected.  However, he stated that he would only vote for a repeal of the Act of Union if injustices around ballots and poor laws were perpetuated.

Walker held his seat until he stood down at the 1841 UK general election.  He died in 1873, still living at Tykillen.

References

Year of birth unknown
1873 deaths
Alumni of Trinity College Dublin
Irish Repeal Association MPs
Members of the Parliament of the United Kingdom for County Wexford constituencies (1801–1922)
People from County Wexford
UK MPs 1831–1832
UK MPs 1832–1835
UK MPs 1835–1837
UK MPs 1837–1841